Geofilum rubicundum is a facultatively anaerobic  bacterium from the genus of Geofilum which has been isolated from deep subseafloor sediments from the Shimokita Peninsula from Japan.

References

External links
Type strain of Geofilum rubicundum at BacDive -  the Bacterial Diversity Metadatabase

Bacteria described in 2012
Bacteroidia